Founded in 1229, the  Toulouse 1 Capitole University (Université Toulouse I Capitole) is one of the three universities of the city of Toulouse, in southwestern France. This university, presided by Hugues Kenfack, focuses on the social sciences (law, political science, economics, administration, etc.).

History 
Toulouse 1 Capitole University is one of the several so-called 'successor' institutions of the University of Toulouse, which was the second university created in France in 1229 after the Sorbonne was founded (around the year 1200). The university originally included four faculties: theology, canon law, civil law and Arts (grammar). The medical school was created in 1257. The University was closed in 1793 as the French Revolution abolished royal universities.

At the end of the Second Empire, the first four faculties co-existed, but the most important was the law school, which contained three-quarters of the students and the most renowned teachers. However, the University of Toulouse suffered due to underfunding of French higher education in province. In the 1880s  Luis Liard and Ernest Lavisse gave enough autonomy to the faculties so the municipality could help those institutions.
Yet the Edgar Faure laws divided the University into three establishments:

 Toulouse 1 University of Social Sciences (Law, Economy and Management);
 Toulouse 2 University of Literature and Human Sciences;
 Toulouse 3 University Paul Sabatier of Sciences and Health.

Only the Toulouse 1 University remains on the historical site of the town center.
In September 2009, the Toulouse 1 University of Social Sciences became the Toulouse 1 Capitole University.

Academics 

Toulouse 1 Capitole educates more than 20,000 students every year, over 15% of which are international students. Students may enroll in a Bachelors program directly after a obtaining a Baccalauréat, or the equivalent high school diploma for international students. Unlike the French Grandes écoles, public university education is open enrollment, tuition is often more affordable, and registration does not require attendance at a post-high school preparatory school. Degrees from French universities are recognized world-wide and awarded by the Ministry of National Education (France).

The institution's academic priorities focus on three areas: international degrees, double-language degrees, and degrees with a high potential for professional integration. The different academic disciplines of UT1 are:

Faculties 
Economics (Toulouse School of Economics) 
Business Administration and Management (Toulouse School of Management)
Law and Political Science
Administration and Communication
Informatics
Technology (University Institutes of Technology)

Departments 
Physical and Sports Activities (DAPS)
Mathematics
Department of Languages ​​and Cultures (DLC)
Institute of Judicial Studies
European School of Law

Instruction in English 
The University offers a number of degree programs in management, economic, law, and technology taught in English-only. Higher education degrees in France are organized into three levels thus facilitating international mobility: the Licence / Bachelor's, Master's, and Doctorate degrees. A Bachelor's degree requires the completion of 180 ECTS credits; a Master's, requires an additional 120 ECTS credits. In 2022, annual tuition for a Bachelors degree taught in English-only was: €262 (US$) for students from anywhere in the world.

Global Management (Bachelors)
International Management (Master's)
Finance (Master's)
International Marketing of Innovation (Master's, double degree)
Econometrics and Empirical Economics (Master's)
Economics of Markets and Organizations (Master's)
Economics & Ecology (Master's)
Environmental and Natural Resources Economics (Master's)
Public Policy and Development (Master's)
Data Science for Social Sciences (Master's)
Mathematics and Economic Decision (Master's)
MIAGE on Innovative Information Systems (Master's)
International Aviation Law (LL.M.)
Comparative & European Private International Law (Master's)
International Economic Law (Master's)
Economics (Ph.D.)
Management (Ph.D.) (partnership with the Grande ėcole Toulouse Business School)

Research 

The University of Toulouse I Capitole and its Toulouse School of Economics were honored in 2014 with the Nobel Prize for Jean Tirole. The internationalization of research is the other facet of the University's European and international strategy. The research centers are involved in numerous projects and scientific cooperation networks with foreign partners, particularly Canadian and Japanese. The University Toulouse Capitole is the home of many laboratoires and research instituts:

 Centre de droit des affaires - Center for business law
 Centre toulousain d'histoire du droit et des idées politiques - Center for history and political science
 Institut de droit privé - Institute for private law
 Institut de mathématique de Toulouse - Institute of mathematics
 Institut de recherche en informatique de Toulouse - Institute of research into information technology
 Institut des études juridiques de l'urbanisme et de la construction - Institute for state law in urbanism
 Institut du droit de l'espace, des territoires et de la communication - Institute for Space, Territories, Culture and Communications Law
 Institut Maurice Hauriou - Institute for public law
 Institute of Research on European, International and Comparative Law
 Laboratoire des sciences sociales du politique - Laboratory of social science politics
 Laboratory of Studies and Research on Economics, Policies and Social Systems
 TSE-R is under tutelage of the CNRS (UMR 5314), the  INRAE (UMR 1415), the EHESS, and the University Toulouse 1 Capitole.
 Toulouse School of Management Research
SIRIUS Chair - Space, Business, and Law - a public-private partnership between the Grande école Toulouse Business School, CNES, Airbus Defense & Space and Thales Alenia Space, dedicated to the law and management of space sector activities.

Location 

UT Capitole is located on four sites in the city center and in the cities of Montauban and Rodez. University buildings cover an area of 78,000 m2 and are available to 17,000 students. On the two sites of the Arsenal and the Anciennes Facultés, a 2 minutes' walk from Place du Capitole, are located most lecture halls and classrooms as well as the main library on the Toulouse campus.

In the city center, there are the Anciennes Facultés where the Toulouse School of Management is located, as well as amphitheaters and two libraries (the Garrigou library in the Anciennes Facultés and the Godechot library in the IEP). The Anciennes Facultés are located at 2, rue Albert-Lautmann.

Also in the city center, the Arsenal, where the Faculty of Law and Political Science and the European School of Law are located, and most of the amphitheaters and classrooms, as well as the university's administrative services. This site also includes the Arsenal library, the university's main library. The Arsenal is located at 2, rue du Doyen-Gabriel-Marty. The campus also houses the Arsenal university restaurant as well as student residences.

Also in the center of Toulouse, the Manufacture des Tabacs, between the Garonne river and the Brienne canal is where most research and library centres are to be found. The Manufacture is located at 21, allée de Brienne and is situated on the other side of the Brienne canal from the two previously mentioned sites.

Two satellite campuses of the University Toulouse Capitole are located in Montauban and Rodez. In the city of Montauban, the University Center of Tarn-et-Garonne is located on Boulevard Montauriol, near the city center. The University of Toulouse 1 Capitole offers the full undergraduate degree in law at  this site. There is a library and a university restaurant on the campus. The University Center of Montauban is unique in its human and dynamic size and offers an ideal setting for students to succeed in their higher education studies. The University Institute of Technology of Rodez (IUT) is located at 50 avenue de Bordeaux in Rodez, Aveyron. The IUT provides a 3-year university education, offering several Bachelor of Technology (BUT) or undergraduate degrees (Licences - 3rd year), and emphasizing a technological approach combining theory and practice. The IUT has modern premises and equipment: 1 documentation center, 1 amphitheater, 1 technology hall, 2 learning labs, and 2 multimedia laboratories.

Partnerships 
Toulouse 1 Capitole University is a founding member of the Federal University of Toulouse Midi-Pyrénées, the association of universities and higher education institutions (ComUE), which is reconstituting the collective Université de Toulouse. Membership includes all large campuses in Toulouse: Jean Jaurès, Paul Sabatier University, Sciences Po Toulouse, INSA Toulouse, ISAE-SUPAERO, as well as the Grande école Toulouse Business School and the 7 Grandes écoles of the National Polytechnic Institute of Toulouse. The university and Toulouse Business School (TBS) jointly award a EFMD-Accredited Ph.D. in management, faculty and students have access to the TBS Research Centre, and TBS research faculty serve on the board of directors. As a collective higher education structure, the Federal University of Toulouse Midi-Pyrénées is the fourth largest in France with over 130,000 students, faculty, and staff.

Libraries and Learning Centers 

The University of Toulouse I Capitole Library is the heir to the former university library created in 1879. Initially an inter-university library, its social sciences section was constituted as a Collective Service of Documentation in 1995. It is now made up of four libraries spread across the university campus.

The Arsenal library, representative of the modern architectural movement(Brutalism), was built in 1972 by the architects Paul de Noyers and Noël Le Maresquier. It offers 900 reading places. In addition to the 45,000 volumes belonging to the prestigious old collection (end of the 19th century - middle of the 20th century) and the volumes inherited from the Law-Literature section, the collections are now specialized in the disciplines taught at the university.

In 1996, a 450-seat library was installed in the renovated premises of the former Toulouse Tobacco Factory, which is now listed as a historical monument. Two other libraries make up Toulouse 1 Capitole's library facilities: the Garrigou library located in the heart of the historic building of the old Faculties and the Boutaric library. These libraries collaborate with the documentation centers of the university's teaching and research units.

In terms of written and documentary heritage, 300,000 e-books complete a collection of 440,000 printed works, theses and dissertations. Over 57,000 online journals are added to the 650 print journal subscriptions; while some 60 specialized databases allow for in-depth bibliographic research.

See also
 University of Toulouse

References

University of Toulouse
Law schools in France
Universities and colleges in Toulouse
Educational institutions established in the 13th century